"Flowing" is a song by the group 311. It first appeared on the 1999 album Soundsystem, and was released as the second single from the album. It was included on 311's Greatest Hits '93-'03 album in 2004.

The song did not obtain as much attention as the first single from Soundsystem, "Come Original", but did reach #17 on the Hot Modern Rock Tracks chart.

The lyrics depict lead singer Nick Hexum's bout with insomnia.

Track listing
  "Flowing (Radio Edit 1)" (3:09)
  "Flowing (Radio Edit 2)" (2:57)

Charts

References

External links

1999 songs
311 (band) songs
Music videos directed by Marcos Siega
Songs written by Nick Hexum
Song recordings produced by Hugh Padgham
1999 singles
Capricorn Records singles